Ext, ext or EXT may refer to:
 Ext functor, used in the mathematical field of homological algebra
 Ext (JavaScript library), a programming library used to build interactive web applications
 Exeter Airport (IATA airport code), in Devon, England
 Exeter St Thomas railway station (station code), in Exeter, England
 Extended file system, a file system created for Linux
 Exton station (Pennsylvania) (Amtrak station code), in Exton, Pennsylvania 
 Extremaduran language (ISO language code), spoken in Spain
 Extremeroller, a former roller coaster at Worlds of Fun, Kansas City, Missouri
 Cadillac Escalade EXT, a sport utility truck